The intrative case (abbreviated ) is a case that roughly expresses the notion of the English preposition "amidst".

It is found in the Limbu language, where it occurs with the locative suffix -ʼō. When conjoined, the two morphemes are pronounced as -lummō.

References
 

Grammatical cases